City of Oxford Rowing Club is a rowing club on the River Thames based on Meadow Lane, Oxford, Oxfordshire.

History
The club was founded in 1968 following the amalgamation of two clubs; Neptune and Hannington. The club have provided eight senior national champion crews.

Honours

British champions

Key = O open, M men, W women, +coxed, -coxless, x sculls, c composite, L lightweight

Notable rowers

See also
Rowing on the River Thames

References

Sport in Oxfordshire
Sport in Oxford
Organisations based in Oxford
Buildings and structures in Oxford
Rowing clubs of the River Thames
Buildings and structures on the River Thames
Rowing clubs in England
Rowing clubs in Oxfordshire